A dam is a barrier obstructing flowing water.

Dam may also refer to:

Places 
 Dam, Bhutan
 Dam, Gennep, in the Dutch municipality of Gennep
 Dam, Hollands Kroon, in the Dutch municipality of Hollands Kroon
 Dam Square, Amsterdam
 Den Dam, in northern Antwerp, Belgium

Abbreviations and acronyms 
 Database activity monitoring
 Decametre
 Denver Art Museum
 Digital asset management
 Direct Action Movement of Solidarity Federation#Direct Action Movement

Transport
 Dalmeny railway station's station code
 Damascus International Airport's IATA code

Other uses 
 Dam (agricultural reservoir)
 DAM (band), a Palestinian rap group
 Dam (Indian coin)
 Dam (Nepali coin)
 Dam (methylase), DNA adenine methylase
 Dam (surname), a surname
 Dams (surname), a surname
 The Dam a 1913 painting by Dominique Lang
 Dental dam
 WCMG, a South Carolina, US radio station once called "94.3 The Dam"
 Dam, female role in the Dominican bélé dance
 Dam, the female parent of a horse, a term used in horse breeding

 "Dam" (Space Ghost Coast to Coast), a television episode

People 
 Atli Dam (1932–2005), Prime Minister of the Faroe Islands
 Henrik Dam (1895–1976), Danish biochemist
 Jan Dam (footballer) (born 1968), Faroese footballer
 Jan Dam (boxer) (1905–1985), Belgian boxer
 José van Dam (born 1940), Belgian bass-baritone
 Kenneth W. Dam (born 1932), American lawyer and politician
 Kurtis Dam (born 1985), Swiss-American drag queen
 Laurens ten Dam (born 1980), Dutch cycle racer
 Peter Mohr Dam (1898–1968), Prime Minister of the Faroe Islands
 Rigmor Dam (born 1971), Faroese politician
 Rob Van Dam (born 1970), American actor
 Thomas Dam (1909–1986), inventor of the troll doll
 Đàm Thanh Xuân (born 1985), Vietnamese swimmer and martial artist

See also 
 
 
 Avalanche dam
 Landslide dam
 Volcanic dam
 Damn (disambiguation)